Lior Reuven (born 12 December 1980) is a former Israeli footballer..

Honours
Liga Artzit
2003–04, 2004–05
Toto Cup Artzit
2003–04
Israel State Cup
2013

References

1981 births
Living people
Israeli Jews
Israeli footballers
Hapoel Kiryat Ono F.C. players
Maccabi Tel Aviv F.C. players
Beitar Tel Aviv F.C. players
Hapoel Nir Ramat HaSharon F.C. players
Hapoel Ashkelon F.C. players
Hakoah Maccabi Amidar Ramat Gan F.C. players
F.C. Ashdod players
Hapoel Acre F.C. players
Beitar Jerusalem F.C. players
Maccabi Netanya F.C. players
Hapoel Ramat Gan F.C. players
Hapoel Bnei Lod F.C. players
Maccabi Sha'arayim F.C. players
Hapoel Bik'at HaYarden F.C. players
Hapoel Hod HaSharon F.C. players
Hapoel Azor F.C. players
Liga Leumit players
Israeli Premier League players
People from Kiryat Ono
Association football defenders